Rh blood group, D antigen also known as Rh polypeptide 1 (RhPI) or cluster of differentiation 240D (CD240D) is a protein that in humans is encoded by the RHD gene.

The RHD gene codes for the RhD erythrocyte membrane protein that is the Rh factor antigen of the Rh blood group system. RHD has sequence similarity to RHCE, RhAG, RhBG, and RhCG and these five genes constitute the Rh family. It was proposed that the erythrocyte Rh complex is a heterotrimer of RhAG, RhD, and RhCE protein subunits. RhAG is a functional ammonia transporter and is required for normal cell surface expression of RhD and RhCE. Patients who lack RhD/RhCE/RhAG on the surface of their erythrocytes have hemolytic anemia. Antibodies to the RhD protein can cause Rh disease.

Model organisms

Model organisms have been used in the study of RHD function. A conditional knockout mouse line, called Rhdtm1a(EUCOMM)Wtsi was generated as part of the International Knockout Mouse Consortium program — a high-throughput mutagenesis project to generate and distribute animal models of disease to interested scientists.

Male and female animals underwent a standardized phenotypic screen to determine the effects of deletion. Twenty five tests were carried out on mutant mice and one significant abnormality was observed: homozygous mutant males had a decrease in mean corpuscular hemoglobin.

References

Further reading

See also
 ABO (gene)

Clusters of differentiation
Membrane proteins
Genes mutated in mice